Baraem (meaning: buds) is a Qatari pay television channel aimed at preschool kids. It was launched on January 16, 2009, and broadcasts 17 hours daily. Previously co-owned by Al Jazeera Media Network and the Qatar Foundation, Al Jazeera acquired full rights to the channel in June 2013. It was then acquired by beIN Media Group on April 1, 2016.

Programming for older children is broadcast on sister channel JeemTV.

History 

The channel was launched on January 16, 2009 as a joint venture between the Qatar Foundation (who owned 90% of the channel) and Al Jazeera Media Network (who owned the remaining 10%). Its on air look was designed by Radiant Studios, who also designed the new on air look for Al Jazeera Children's Channel that debuted the same day.

A European feed of both JCC and Baraem launched on Hotbird on November 1, 2012.

On June 15, 2013, it was announced that Al Jazeera would acquire the Qatar Foundation's assets to both JeemTV and Baraem.

On April 1, 2016, the channel was acquired by beIN Channels Network alongside JeemTV.

On January 1, 2017, the channel received a rebrand to coincide with its 8th anniversary. This time the new look was designed in-house.

Broadcast

Ever since launch, the channel broadcasts 17 hours a day, from 5:00 to 22:00 (GMT+3).

In 2011, the channel started broadcasting in 16:9 aspect ratio.

From launch until April 1, 2016, the channel was free to view on Nilesat, Arabsat, Hot Bird and Eurobird, and since then it was exclusive to beIN Channels Network. However the Hot Bird feed remained free to view until June 1, 2018.

References

External links
 Official website
Former website

Arabic-language television stations
Children's television networks
Television channels and stations established in 2009
Preschool education television networks